The Big Dance is a future Australian Turf Club thoroughbred horse race run over 1,600 metres on turf at Randwick Racecourse in Sydney, Australia.

To be run for the first time on 1 November 2022, with prizemoney of $2 million, the Big Dance will be restricted to horses contesting one of the 25 selected NSW Country Cups.

It will be held 30 minutes after Australia's largest horse race, the Melbourne Cup. The Victoria Racing Club accused Racing NSW of ambush marketing.

References

Horse races in Australia
Randwick Racecourse
Recurring sporting events established in 2022
Sports competitions in Sydney
2022 establishments in Australia